Sundblad is a Swedish surname. Notable people with the surname include:

Emily Sundblad (born 1977), American painter, singer and art dealer
Eric Sundblad (1897–1983), Swedish sprinter
Linda Sundblad (born 1981), Swedish singer, actress and model
Niklas Sundblad (born 1973), Swedish ice hockey player

Swedish-language surnames